Rachael vs. Guy: Celebrity Cook-Off is an American cooking competition series that premiered on Food Network on January 1, 2012. The series pits Team Captains Rachael Ray and Guy Fieri against each other in determining who is the best cooking mentor toward their team of four celebrities. Each week, one celebrity will be eliminated, with the "last star standing" winning a $50,000.00 cash donation toward their charity. The series premiere earned 3.524 million viewers, and a rating of 1.1; it ranked 3rd overall in the cable ratings that night. The second season premiered on January 6, 2013, the third season on January 13, 2014.

Season One

Participating celebrities
In the premiere episode, Guy & Rachael played "roshambo" to determine who would pick first for their teams. Guy won (paper beating rock) and chose first. Here are how the teams were chosen, and what charity each celebrity was supporting:

Celebrity progress

 (WIN) The celebrity won the series.
 (RUNNER-UP) The celebrity was the runner-up of the series.
 (WIN) The celebrity won the task.
 (IN) The celebrity lost the task but was not in the bottom two.
 (LOW) The celebrity competed in and won the cook-off to advance to the next round.
 (OUT) The celebrity lost that week's cook-off and was eliminated from the competition.

Episodes

Episode One: Celebrity Food Festival
As described above, the teams are chosen and given their first task: supply food for the first ever Celebrity Cook-Off Food Festival, to be attended by 150 people. Each person is given a token to give to the celebrity who, in their opinion, made the best dish. The team with the most tokens wins the task and is safe from elimination. The two members of the losing team with the least tokens will have a 10-minute "secret ingredient" cook-off to determine who advances and who is eliminated (similar to the "Secret Ingredient Showdown" in the 2011 The Next Iron Chef: Super Chefs competition).

Each team had a 90-minute brainstorming session with their coach to determine the overall theme for their dishes, then was given two hours to cook their dishes before serving them to the Festival-goers.

Team Rachael's food theme: "Hot in the City" (Spicy Foods)
Team Guy's food theme: Mexican Foods
Winning team: Team Guy
Bottom 2 Cook-Off Participants: Aaron Carter and Taylor Dayne
Elimination Cook-Off Secret Ingredient: Shrimp
Advanced: Taylor Dayne
Eliminated: Aaron Carter

Episode Two: Let Them Eat Cake

The contestants make desserts judged by 13 pastry students and instructors. Each of the 13-student panel would grade the contestants' dishes on four different scores.

Winning team: Tie (Each team received 26 points out of a maximum of 52)
Bottom 2 Cook-Off Participants: Alyssa Campanella and Summer Sanders (Due to the tie, the team captains were chosen for the cook-off.)
Elimination Cook-Off Assignment: Salad
Advanced: Summer Sanders
Eliminated: Alyssa Campanella

Episode Three: Chopping Block

The remaining six have one-on-one battles, to prepare favorite dishes of three judges from Chopped. (Note: winners' names appear in bold)
 Marcus Samuelsson (Fried chicken): Coolio vs. Lou Diamond Philips
 Scott Conant (Tomato & basil pasta sauce): Taylor Dayne vs. Joey Fatone
 Alex Guarnaschelli (Porterhouse steak): Summer Sanders vs. Cheech Marin
Winning team: Team Rachael (2 out of 3 rounds)
Bottom 3 Cook-Off Participants: Lou Diamond Philips, Cheech Marin, and Joey Fatone
Elimination Cook-Off Assignment: Grilled cheese sandwich
Advanced: Joey Fatone and Lou Diamond Philips
Eliminated: Cheech Marin

Episode Four: Food Lunch Trucks
The remaining five are asked to run food trucks

Winning team: Team Guy
Bottom 2 Cook-Off Participants: Taylor Dayne and Summer Sanders
Elimination Cook Off Assignment: Amuse-bouche
Advanced: Taylor Dayne
Eliminated: Summer Sanders

Episode Five: Friends and Family Favorites
The remaining four are asked to cater a three-course dinner for ten.

Advanced: Coolio, Lou Diamond Philips
Bottom 2 Cook-Off Participants: Joey Fatone, Taylor Dayne
Elimination Cook Off Assignment: Use anything in the pantry
Third Place: Joey Fatone (Fried rice)
Fourth place: Taylor Dayne (Matzah ball soup)

Episode Six: Restaurant Battle
The final two are asked to run their own restaurants, to be judged by Tim and Nina Zagat, based on comments of 40 diners.

Winning team: Team Rachael
Winner: Lou Diamond Philips (28/30)
Runner-up: Coolio (23/30)

Season Two

Participating celebrities

Celebrity progress

 (WINNER) The celebrity won the series.
 (RUNNER-UP) The celebrity was the runner-up of the series.
 (WIN) The celebrity won the task.
 (IN) The celebrity lost the task but was not in the bottom two.
 (LOW) The celebrity competed in and won the cook-off to advance to the next round.
 (OUT) The celebrity lost that week's cook-off and was eliminated from the competition.

Episodes

Episode One: The Show Must Go On
Teams are chosen, and the teams' first challenge is to prepare a tasting menu. Each team must produce four individual dishes plus one team dessert, and put on a skit.
Team Rachael Captain: Kathy Najimy
Team Guy Captain: Dean McDermott
Winning team: Team Guy
Bottom 2 Cook-Off Participants: Kathy Najimy and Gilbert Gottfried
Elimination Cook-Off Assignment: Ideal midnight snack
Advanced: Kathy Najimy 
Eliminated: Gilbert Gottfried

Episode Two: Hollywood Walk of Farm
The two teams visit a farm to learn about fresh cooking. For their challenge, each team member must create a dish with a specific meat product, such as salmon or lamb chops, along with a side dish that includes vegetables that they must pick on their own as a team.

Team Rachael Captain: Carnie Wilson
Team Guy Captain: Cornelia Guest
Winning team: Team Rachael
Bottom 2 Cook-Off Participants: Cornelia Guest and Dean McDermott
Elimination Cook-Off Assignment: Corn
Advanced: Dean McDermott
Eliminated: Cornelia Guest

Episode Three: Bright Lights, Big Classics
The teams run their own diners with the help of wait staff. Each team member is responsible for one of three diner classics: the tuna melt, the cheeseburger, or the club sandwich. One member must also entertain the crowd.

Team Rachael Captain: Hines Ward
Team Guy Captain: Johnny Weir
Winning team: Team Rachael
Bottom 2 Cook-Off Participants: Chilli and Dean McDermott
Elimination Cook-Off Assignment: Milkshake
Advanced: Dean McDermott
Eliminated: Chilli

Episode Four: Picky Palates
The remaining five have to create a child's birthday party menu

Winning team: Tie
Bottom 2 Cook-Off Participants: Johnny Weir and Carnie Wilson
Elimination Cook-Off Assignment: Hot dogs
Advanced: Carnie Wilson
Eliminated: Johnny Weir

Episode Five: Lights, Camera, Lunch Trucks
The remaining four are asked to run food trucks and are judged individually.

Winning cook: Dean McDermott
Bottom 3 Cook-Off Participants: Carnie Wilson, Hines Ward, and Kathy Najimy
Elimination Cook-Off Assignment: Anything on a stick
Advanced: Carnie Wilson
Eliminated: Hines Ward and Kathy Najimy

Episode Six: Star Studded Supper

Winning team: Team Guy
Winner: Dean McDermott
Runner-Up: Carnie Wilson

Season Three

Participating celebrities

Celebrity progress

 (WIN) The celebrity won the series.
 (RUNNER-UP) The celebrity was the runner-up of the series.
 (WIN) The celebrity won the task.
 (IN) The celebrity lost the task but was not eliminated.
 (MVP) The celebrity was their team's MVP.
 (OUT) The celebrity was eliminated.

Episodes

Episode One: Chefs of the Roundtable
Teams are chosen, and the teams' first challenge is to prepare a medieval themed meal.
Guest Judge: Lee Anne Wong
Winning Team: Team Guy
MVP: Tiffany
Eliminated: No One

Episode Two: Leis in the Fray
The teams must prepare a meal for a luau.
Guest Judge: Marc Murphy
Winning Team: Team Rachael
MVP: Florence Henderson
Eliminated: Chris Kattan

Episode Three: Supermarket Smackdown

Guest Judge: Madison Cowan
Winning Team:Team Guy
MVP: Penn Jillette and Herschel Walker
Eliminated: Jake Pavelka

Episode Four: Big Game Grub
The episode is set in a sports center. In the first challenge, the celebrities must make chicken wings (vegetarian Vanilla Ice was allowed to instead make a similar game day food out of tofu). Based on that, each team's MVP gets chosen who also gains immunity from elimination. In the next challenge, they have to cook elevated stadium food.
Guest Judge: Alex Guarnaschelli and Josh Elliott
Winning Team: Team Guy
MVP: Penn Jillette and Herschel Walker
Eliminated: Judy Gold

Episode Five: Boardwalk Bites
First, in a mini-challenge to win a 10-minute advantage in the main challenge, the celebrities must make French fries. In the main challenge they must make hot dogs.
Guest Judge: Amanda Freitag
Winning Team: Team Rachael
MVP:  Florence Henderson
Eliminated: Vanilla Ice
The finalists therefore are Herschel Walker, Tiffany, Penn Jillette and Florence Henderson.

Episode Six: Sink or Swim
Aboard a ship, the finalists have to cook three-course dinners with Vanilla Ice and Judy Gold assisting them. They have to give five-minute presentations.
 Judges: Aaron Sanchez, Scott Conant, Sunny Anderson, and some restaurateurs.
Winning Celebrity: Herschel Walker
Penn was the runner-up and was given $5,000 for his charity from Rachael and Guy's own money.

References

External links

2012 American television series debuts
2010s American cooking television series
2010s American reality television series
Food Network original programming
English-language television shows